Lanzhou beef noodle soup (兰州牛肉面) is a variety of beef noodle soup. This dish has an extensive history, and the recipe differs by region due to cultural factors, availability of ingredients, and local innovations.

History 

One of the oldest beef noodle soups is the Lanzhou hand-pulled noodle or Lanzhou lamian (兰州拉面) in Mandarin, which was originated by the Hui people of northwest China during the Tang dynasty. Though there is some debate about when Lanzhou hand-pulled noodles originated, the recipe is named after the major city in Gansu Province, Lanzhou City, which stretches to the Yellow River and was a stop on the ancient Silk Road. The Hui Muslim population or Hui People developed a variation of beef noodle soup noodle that is compatible with the Muslim diet with easy to prepare ingredients. There are numerous beef noodle soups available in China, with a wider variety in the west than the east.

The Dish 
Lanzhou beef noodle soup is a Chinese Muslim style of beef noodle soup, also known as clear-broth or consommé-stewed beef noodle. It often uses halal (or qingzhen) meat and contains no soy sauce, resulting in a lighter taste that may be flavored by salt and herbs. Local lore attributes its creation with a Hui Chinese man from Lanzhou named Ma Baozi (马宝子). In Lanzhou, the capital of Gansu province, Lanzhou Beef Lamian is usually served with clear soup and one hand-pulled lamian noodle per bowl. In halal restaurants, only quality local beef from the Southern Yellow cattle prepared by the local halal butcher is used. 
Chinese radish and a specially cooked spicy oil are also indispensable partners to Lanzhou beef noodles. To identify the ingredients and the dish, the local government news company suggests preparing the soup by the following five steps: "One Clear, Two White, Three Red, Four Green, Five Yellow". First, the beef soup should look clear; Second, the radish slides should be crystal white; Thirdly, the color of the chili oil should be bright red; Fourth, the green cilantro leaves and garlic shoots should be jade, and, lastly, the noodle should be smooth and bright yellow. In overseas Chinese communities in North America, this food can be found in Chinese restaurants. In Mainland China, a large bowl of it is often taken as a whole meal with or without any side dishes.

Different Lanzhou hand-pulled noodle styles 
Traditional Lanzhou beef soup noodle could be made from any one of eight styles of noodles: Thinnest (毛细), Thinner (细面), Thin (三细), Thick (二细), Thicker (粗面), Prism (韭叶), Wide (宽面), and Wider (大宽). Thinnest or hair thin is "a round noodle about two-thirds of the thickness of a spaghetti", and the thinner style and thin style are just about the size of spaghetti with minimal difference. The thick and thicker style is round noodles that are sized thicker than thin. Prism, wide, and wider are flat thin noodles that provide a different texture. Additionally, a more novel type of noodle is Qiaomaileng (荞麦棱), in which the noodle is highlighted by its angular shape. To provide an example, take a look at the 1919 Lanzhou Beef Noodle restaurant for more information about the noodle styles.

Many restaurants across the globe include but are not limited to these seven types of noodle styles. This is because of the evolution of noodle making and the combination of the local culture. According to omnivore's cookbook, the Lanzhou hand-pull noodles should be even in its width and thickness, and the ingredients should also be prepared in 
certain dimensions. 
In mainland China, restaurants that specialize in Lanzhou beef noodle soup may provide customers to watch how the noodles are made, similar to the food production line layout of Din Tai Fung. The hand-made noodle dough is normally made the day before being used. However, the hand-made noodles are freshly pulled into shapes on the day the noodle is being cooked. The noodle pulling process is quick and can take up to several minutes, including repetitively rolling, pulling, and spinning. Right after the noodle is in shape, the noodle is boiling until fully cooked.

References

Soups